Plectin is a giant protein found in nearly all mammalian cells which acts as a link between the three main components of the cytoskeleton: actin microfilaments, microtubules and intermediate filaments.  In addition, plectin links the cytoskeleton to junctions found in the plasma membrane that structurally connect different cells. By holding these different networks together, plectin plays an important role in maintaining the mechanical integrity and viscoelastic properties of tissues.

Structure 

Plectin can exist in cells as several alternatively-spliced isoforms, all around 500 kDa and >4000 amino acids. The structure of plectin is thought to be a dimer consisting of a central coiled coil of alpha helices connecting two large globular domains (one at each terminus). These globular domains are responsible for connecting plectin to its various cytoskeletal targets. The carboxy-terminal domain is made of 6 highly homologous repeating regions. The subdomain between regions five and six of this domain is known to connect to the intermediate filaments cytokeratin and vimentin.  At the opposite end of the protein, in the N-terminal domain, a region has been defined as responsible for binding to actin. In 2004, the exact crystal structure of this actin-binding domain (ABD) was determined in mice and shown to be composed of two calponin homology (CH) domains. Plectin is expressed in nearly all mammalian tissues. In cardiac muscle and skeletal muscle, plectin is localized to specialized entities known as Z-discs. Plectin binds several proteins, including vinculin, DES, actin., fodrin, microtubule-associating proteins, nuclear laminin B., SPTAN1, vimentin and ITGB4.

Function 

Studies employing a plectin knockout mouse have shed light on the functions of plectin. Pups died 2–3 days after birth, and these mice exhibited marked skin abnormalities, including degeneration of keratinocytes. Skeletal and cardiac muscle tissues were also significantly affected. Cardiac intercalated discs were disintegrated and sarcomeres were irregularly shapen, and intracellular accumulation of aberrant isolated myofibrillar bundles and Z-disc components was also observed. Expression of vinculin in muscle cells was strikingly down-regulated. 
Through the use of gold-immunoelectron microscopy, immunoblotting and immunofluorescence experiments plectin has been found to associate with all three major components of the cytoskeleton. In muscle, plectin binds to the periphery of Z-discs, and along with the intermediate filament protein desmin, may form lateral linkages among neighboring Z-discs. This interaction between plectin and desmin intermediate filaments also appears to facilitate the close association of myofibrils and mitochondria, both at Z-discs and along the remainder the sarcomere. Plectin also functions to link cytoskeleton to intercellular junctions, such as desmosomes and hemidesmosomes, which link intermediate filament networks between cells. Plectin has been revealed to localize to the desmosomes and in vitro studies have shown that it can form bridges between the desmosome protein, desmoplakin and intermediate filaments. In hemidesmosomes plectin has been shown to interact with the integrin β4 subunits of the hemidesmosome plaque and function in a clamp-like manner to link the intermediate filament cytokeratin to the junction.

Clinical significance 

Mutations in PLEC have been associated with epidermolysis bullosa simplex with muscular dystrophy. A missense variant of PLEC has been recently proposed as a cause of atrial fibrillation in some populations. Isolated left ventricular non-compaction accompanying epidermolysis bullosa simplex with muscular dystrophy was also noted.
Plectin has been proposed as a biomarker for pancreatic cancer. Although normally a cytoplasmic protein, plectin is expressed on the cell membrane in pancreatic ductal adenocarcinoma (PDAC) and can therefore be used to target PDAC cells.

See also 
 List of target antigens in pemphigus

References

Further reading

External links 
Mass spectrometry characterization of one isoform of PLEC at COPaKB.
  GeneReviews/NCBI/NIH/UW entry on Epidermolysis Bullosa with Pyloric Atresia
 
 

Plakins